Busiate (or busiati) are a type of long macaroni, originally from the Trapani province, and typical from Calabria and Sicily in Italy.

The name busiate can be used to describe two different shapes, although the basic coiling technique is similar:

  are traditionally prepared by diagonally coiling a strand of pasta around a twig of ampelodesmos.
  are coiled vertically around a long pin, such as a knitting needle. Their shape is closer to that of bucatini.

Busiate are traditionally served with pesto alla trapanese, a sauce made of almonds, tomatoes, garlic and basil.

Notes and references

Types of pasta
Cuisine of Sicily
Trapani